The National Library of East Timor is the national library and the national archive of East Timor. Its building is under construction since 2011 in Ai-Tarak Laran, a quarter in the Suco of Kampung Alur in the Dom Aleixo Subdistrict of the country's capital Dili.

The institution was created with a governmental resolution in 2009. It is slowly building a Library catalog mainly with international donations. In 2014, the catalog consisted in 2,500 items donated by the National Library of Portugal.

Groundbreaking for the library happened in 2017, while construction began in 2022.

References

External links 
 National Library of East Timor Annual Report 2014 (pdf)
 Timor-Leste Art and Culture: The Future National Library and Timor-Leste Archives, governmental article dating from 10 of November 2010

See also 
 List of national libraries

East Timor
Libraries in East Timor
Libraries established in 2009